Monte Quemado Airport is a public use airport  north of Monte Quemado, a town in the Santiago del Estero Province of Argentina.

See also

Transport in Argentina
List of airports in Argentina

References

External links 
OpenStreetMap - Monte Quemado
OurAirports - Monte Quemado Airport
WorldAirportCodes - Monte Quemado Airport

Airports in Argentina
Santiago del Estero Province